Parliamentary elections were held in Chile on 16 December 2001. The Concert of Parties for Democracy alliance remained the largest faction in the Chamber of Deputies, but saw its majority in the Chamber reduced to just two seats.

Results

Senate

Chamber of Deputies

References

Elections in Chile
2001 elections in Chile
December 2001 events in South America